The Capture of the Amambaí steam occurred on January 6, 1865, when the Paraguayan corvettes Iporá and Rio Apa attacked the Amambaí gunboat on São Lourenço River, after the people who had been evacuated from the Fort of Coimbra and Corumbá landed in Sará. Iporá rammed the gunboat Amambaí, throwing it against the bank, near Morro do Caracará.

References 

Naval battles of the Paraguayan War
Maritime incidents in Brazil
Maritime incidents in January 1865
January 1865 events